Andrew Schwab is the lead singer for the band Project 86. He is also a graphic designer, calligrapher, author, and hosts Pioneers Podcast: Finding Your Creative Voice.

Project 86

In 1996, Schwab formed Project 86 with, Matt Hernandez, Ethan Luck, and Randy Torres and recorded a Demo. Hernandez left soon after and was replaced by Luck, who was replaced by Alex Albert on the Drums. Luck left a year later and was replaced by Steven Dail.

Project 86's first five albums consisted of this lineup before Albert departed and was replaced by Jason Gerken, formerly of Shiner and Open Hand. The band recorded two albums and two EPs with this line-up before the remaining members, minus Schwab, quit the band.

Gerken was replaced by Scott Davis, Dail was replaced by Mike Williams, and Torres was replaced by Dustinn Lowry. The band recorded Wait for the Siren before Davis and Williams quit. They were replaced by Cody Driggers of The Wedding and Ryan Wood formerly of 7 Horns 7 Eyes.

The band, along with Darren King, of The Overseer, recorded their ninth album, Knives to the Future in 2014. Lowry quit the band and was replaced by King in 2015.  Their latest album, Sheep Among Wolves, was the result of a wildly successful crowdfund campaign to celebrate the 20th Anniversary of the band.

London SiX Echo
London SiX Echo is a side-project of Schwab. After recording Knives to the Future with Project 86, he recorded three songs ("Counter Measures", "I Am The Beginning", "seRaPH (The Dragon)) for a solo EP.

Author, interviewer and writer
Schwab conducts interviews with other people from other bands, such as Tobin Bawinkel of Flatfoot 56. He has written 22 articles for HM Magazine and 74 for CCM. He also hosts Pioneers Podcast: Finding Your Creative Voice.

Bands
 Project 86 – Vocals (1996–present)
 London SiX Echo – Vocals (2014–present)

Discography
P86
 Project 86 (1998)
 Drawing Black Lines (2000)
 Truthless Heroes (2002)
 Songs to Burn Your Bridges By (2003)
 ...And the Rest Will Follow (2005)
 Rival Factions (2007)
 The Kane Mutiny EP (2007)
 This Time of Year EP (2008)
 Picket Fence Cartel (2009)
 Wait for the Siren (2012)
 The Midnight Clear Single (2012)
 Knives to the Future (2014)
 Sheep Among Wolves (2017)

LSXE
 "Counter Measures" (2014)
 "I Am the Beginning" (2014)
 "seRaPH (The Dragon) (2014)

Guest vocals
 "Self Mind Dead" - Death Therapy (2017)
"Panic Room" - Disciple (2019)

Bibliography
as Author
 We Caught You Plotting Murder (2002)
 Do Not Disturb (2003)
 It's All Downhill From Here: On The Road With Project 86 (2004)
 Fame Is Infamy (2010)
 The Tin Soldiers (2012)

References

External links

 
 Andrew Schwab Interview on Indie Vision Music
 Andy Schwab interview on Jesus Freak Hideout

Christian metal musicians
Living people
American performers of Christian music
1975 births
Nu metal singers
21st-century American singers
21st-century American male singers
Project 86 members